Kodjo Doussé (born June 24, 1996 in Bamako) is a Malian footballer.

International career

International goals
Scores and results list Mali's goal tally first.

References

External links
Player profile - soccerway.com

1996 births
Living people
Malian footballers
Association football forwards
AS Real Bamako players
Malian expatriate footballers
Expatriate footballers in Algeria
DRB Tadjenanet players
MC Oran players
Algerian Ligue Professionnelle 1 players
Mali international footballers
21st-century Malian people